The Centre Pompidou, more fully the Centre national d'art et de culture Georges-Pompidou, also known as the Pompidou Centre in English, is a complex building in the Beaubourg area of the 4th arrondissement of Paris, near Les Halles, rue Montorgueil, and the Marais. It was designed in the style of high-tech architecture by the architectural team of Richard Rogers, Su Rogers, Renzo Piano, along with Gianfranco Franchini.

It houses the Bibliothèque publique d'information (Public Information Library), a vast public library; the Musée National d'Art Moderne, which is the largest museum for modern art in Europe; and IRCAM, a centre for music and acoustic research. Because of its location, the centre is known locally as Beaubourg. It is named after Georges Pompidou, the President of France from 1969 to 1974 who commissioned the building, and was officially opened on 31 January 1977 by President Valéry Giscard d'Estaing.

The centre had 1.5 million visitors in 2021, up by 65 percent from 2020, but a considerable drop from 2019 due to closings caused by the  COVID pandemic. It has had over 180 million visitors since 1977 and more than 5,209,678 visitors in 2013, including 3,746,899 for the museum.

History
The idea for a multicultural complex, bringing together in one place different forms of art and literature, developed, in part, from the ideas of France's first Minister of Cultural Affairs, André Malraux, a proponent of the decentralisation of art and culture by impulse of the political power. In the 1960s, city planners decided to move the foodmarkets of Les Halles, historically significant structures long prized by Parisians, with the idea that some of the cultural institutes be built in the former market area. Hoping to renew the idea of Paris as a leading city of culture and art, it was proposed to move the Musée d'Art Moderne to this new location. Paris also needed a large, free public library, as one did not exist at this time. At first the debate concerned Les Halles, but as the controversy settled, in 1968, President Charles de Gaulle announced the Plateau Beaubourg as the new site for the library. A year later in 1969, Georges Pompidou, the new president, adopted the Beaubourg project and decided it to be the location of both the new library and a centre for the contemporary arts. In the process of developing the project, the IRCAM (Institut de Recherche et Coordination Acoustique/Musique) was also housed in the complex.

The Rogers and Piano design was chosen among 681 competition entries. World-renowned architects Oscar Niemeyer, Jean Prouvé and Philip Johnson made up the jury. It was the first time in France that international architects were allowed to participate. The selection was announced in 1971 at a "memorable press conference" where the contrast between the sharply-dressed Pompidou and "hairy young crew" of architects represented a "grand bargain between radical architecture and establishment politics."

Architecture

Design 

It was the first major example of an 'inside-out' building with its structural system, mechanical systems, and circulation exposed on the exterior of the building. Initially, all of the functional structural elements of the building were colour-coded: green pipes are plumbing, blue ducts are for climate control, electrical wires are encased in yellow, and circulation elements and devices for safety (e.g., fire extinguishers) are red. According to Piano, the design was meant to be “not a building but a town where you find everything – lunch, great art, a library, great music”.

National Geographic described the reaction to the design as "love at second sight." An article in Le Figaro declared: "Paris has its own monster, just like the one in Loch Ness." But two decades later, while reporting on Rogers' winning the Pritzker Prize in 2007, The New York Times noted that the design of the Centre "turned the architecture world upside down" and that "Mr. Rogers earned a reputation as a high-tech iconoclast with the completion of the 1977 Pompidou Centre, with its exposed skeleton of brightly coloured tubes for mechanical systems". The Pritzker jury said the Pompidou "revolutionised museums, transforming what had once been elite monuments into popular places of social and cultural exchange, woven into the heart of the city."

Construction 
The centre was built by GTM and completed in 1977. The building cost 993 million French francs. Renovation work conducted from October 1996 to January 2000 was completed on a budget of 576 million francs. The principal engineer was the renowned Peter Rice, responsible for amongst other things the Gerberette. During the renovation, the centre was closed to the public for 27 months, re-opening on 1 January 2000.

In September 2020, it was announced that the Centre Pompidou would begin renovations in 2023 which will require either a partial closure for seven years, or a full closure for three years. The projected cost for the upcoming renovations is $235 million. In January 2021 Roselyne Bachelot, France's culture minister, announced that the centre would close completely in 2023 for four years.

Stravinsky Fountain

The nearby Stravinsky Fountain (also called the Fontaine des automates), on Place Stravinsky, features 16 whimsical moving and water-spraying sculptures by Jean Tinguely and Niki de Saint-Phalle, which represent themes and works by composer Igor Stravinsky. The black-painted mechanical sculptures are by Tinguely, the coloured works by de Saint-Phalle. The fountain opened in 1983.

Video footage of the fountain appeared frequently throughout the French language telecourse, French in Action.

Place Georges Pompidou
The Place Georges Pompidou in front of the museum is noted for the presence of street performers, such as mimes and jugglers. In the spring, miniature carnivals are installed temporarily into the place in front with a wide variety of attractions: bands, caricature and sketch artists, tables set up for evening dining, and even skateboarding competitions. 

In 2021 artists duo Arotin And Serghei realized for the re-inaugaration of the Place Georges Pompidou after years of works, and in the context of IRCAM's festival Manifeste the intermedial large-scale installation Infinite Light Columns / Constellations of The Future 1-4, Tribute to Constantin Brancusi, installed along Renzo Piano's IRCAM Tower, on the opposite site of Brancusi's studio, visible from both, the Place Igor Stravinsky and Place Georges Pompidou. The president of the Centre Pompidou, Serge Lasvignes, highlighted in his inauguration speech: "The installation symbolizes what the Centre Pompidou wants to be, ... a multidisciplinary ensemble, ... it is the resurrection of the initial spirit of the Centre Pompidou with the Piazza, the living heart of creation".

Attendance
By the mid-1980s, the Centre Pompidou was becoming the victim of its huge and unexpected popularity, its many activities, and a complex administrative structure. When Dominique Bozo returned to the Centre in 1981 as Director of the Musée National d'Art Moderne, he re-installed the museum, bringing out the full range of its collections and displayed the many major acquisitions that had been made. By 1992, the Centre de Création Industrielle was incorporated into the Musée National d'Art Moderne, henceforth called "MNAM/CCI". The CCI as an organisation with its own, design-oriented programme ceased to exist, while the MNAM started to develop a design and architecture collection, in addition to its modern and contemporary art collection.

The Centre Pompidou was intended to handle 8,000 visitors a day. In its first two decades it attracted more than 145 million visitors, more than five times the number first predicted. , more than 180 million people have visited the centre since its opening in 1977. However, until the 1997–2000 renovation, 20 percent of the centre's eight million annual visitors—predominantly foreign tourists—rode the escalators up the outside of the building to the platform for the sights.

Since re-opening in 2000 after a three-year renovation, the Centre Pompidou has improved accessibility for visitors. Now they can only access the escalators if they pay to enter the museum.

Since 2006, the global attendance of the centre is no longer calculated at the main entrance, but only the one of the Musée National d'Art Moderne and of the public library (5,209,678 visitors for both in 2013), but without the other visitors of the building (929,431 in 2004 or 928,380 in 2006, for only the panorama tickets or cinemas, festivals, lectures, bookshops, workshops, restaurants, etc.). In 2017, the museum had 3.37 million visitors. The public library had 1.37 million.

The Musée National d'Art Moderne itself saw an increase in attendance from 3.1 million (2010) to 3.6 million visitors in 2011 and 3.75 million in 2013.

The 2013 retrospective "Dalí" broke the museum's daily attendance record: 7,364 people a day went to see the artist's work (790,000 in total).

Exhibitions
Several major exhibitions are organised each year on either the first or sixth floors. Among them, many monographs:

 Marcel Duchamp (1977)
 Paul Davis (1977)
 Henri Michaux (1978)
 Dalí (1979)
 Pollock (1982)
 Bonnard (1984)
 Kandinsky (1984)
 Étienne Martin (1984)
 Paul Klee (1985)
 Cy Twombly (1988)
 Frank Stella (1988)
 Andy Warhol (1990)
 Max Ernst (1991)
 Matisse (1993)
 Joseph Beuys (1994)
 Kurt Schwitters (1994)
 Gerard Gasiorowski (1995)
 Brâncuși (1995)
 Sanejouand (1995)
 Bob Morris (1995)
 Francis Bacon (1996)
 Fernand Léger (1997)
 David Hockney (1998)
 Philip Guston (2000)
 Picasso (2000)
 Jean Dubuffet (2001)
 Roland Barthes (2002)
 Max Beckmann (2002)
 Nicolas de Staël (2003)
 Sophie Calle (2003)
 Cocteau (2003)
 Philippe Starck (2003)
 Miró (2004)
 Aurelie Nemours (2004)
 Charlotte Perriand (2005)
 Robert Rauschenberg (2006)
 Claude Closky (2006)
 Jean-Luc Godard (2006)
 Yves Klein (2006)
 Hergé (2006)
 Annette Messager (2007)
 Richard Rogers (2007)
 Samuel Beckett (2007)
 David Claerbout (2007)
 Julio González (2007)
 Alberto Giacometti (2007)
 Louise Bourgeois (2008)
 Pol Abraham (2008)
 Tatiana Trouvé (2008)
 Miroslav Tichy (2008)
 Dominique Perrault (2008)
 Jean Gourmelin (2008)
 Jacques Villeglé (2008)
 Ron Arad (2008)
 Alexander Calder (2009)
 Philippe Parreno (2009)
 Kandinski (2009)
 Pierre Soulages (2009)
 Étienne Martin (2010)
 Lucian Freud (2010)
 Arman (2010)
 François Morellet (2011)
 Edvard Munch (2011)
 Gerhard Richter (2012)
 Salvador Dalí (2013)
 Roy Lichtenstein (2013)
 Mike Kelley (2013)
 Pierre Huyghe (2013)
 Henri Cartier-Bresson (2014)
 Simon Hantaï (2014)
 Jeff Koons (2014)
 Mona Hatoum (2015)
 Wifredo Lam (2015)
 Dominique Gonzalez-Foerster (2015)
 André Derain (2017)
 Latiff Mohidin (2018)
 Richard Linklater (2019)
 Vasarely (2019)
 Christo and Jeanne-Claude (2020)
 Hito Steyerl (2020)
 Alice Neel (2020)
 Matisse (2020)
 Catherine Meurisse (2020–21)

Group exhibitions
 Photography as a weapon of class (2018 Group Exhibition)
 Coder le monde (2018 Group Exhibition)
 La Fabrique Du Vivant (2019 Group Exhibition)
 Jo-Ey Tang & Thomas Fougeirol – Dust. The Plates Of The Present (2020 Group Exhibition)
 Les Moyens Du Bord (2020 Group Exhibition)
 Global(e) Resistance – Pour une histoire engagée de la collection contemporaine de Jonathas de Andrade à Billie Zangewa (2020 Group Exhibition)
 NEURONS Simulated intelligence (2020 Group Exhibition)
 L'écologie des images (2021 Group Exhibition)

Expansion

Regional branches 

In 2010, the Centre Georges Pompidou opened a regional branch, the Centre Pompidou-Metz, in Metz a city 250 kilometres east of Paris. The new museum is part of an effort to expand the display of contemporary arts beyond Paris's large museums. The new museum's building was designed by the architect Shigeru Ban with a curving and asymmetrical pagoda-like roof topped by a spire and punctured by upper galleries. The 77-metre central spire is a nod to the year the Centre Georges Pompidou of Paris was built – 1977. The Centre Pompidou-Metz displays unique, temporary exhibitions from the collection of the Musée National d'Art Moderne, which is not on display at the main Parisian museum. 
Since its inauguration, the institution has become the most visited cultural venue in France outside Paris, accommodating 550,000 visitors/year.

Launched in 2011 in Chaumont, the museum for the first time went on the road to the French regions with a selection of works from the permanent collection. To do this, it designed and constructed a mobile gallery, which, in the spirit of a circus, will make camp for a few months at a time in towns throughout the country. However, in 2013, the Centre Pompidou halted its mobile-museum project because of the cost.

In 2014, plans were released for a temporary satellite of the Centre Pompidou in the northern French town of Maubeuge close to the Belgian border. The 3,000-square-metre outpost, to be designed by the architects Pierre Hebbelinck and Pierre de Wit, is said to be located at the 17th-century Maubeuge Arsenal for four years. The cost of the project is €5.8 million.

In 2015, the city authorities in Libourne, a town in south-western France, proposed a Pompidou branch housed in a former military base called Esog.

In 2019, the Centre Pompidou announced plans to open a  conservation, exhibition and storage space in Massy (Essonne) by 2025. Project backers include the Région Ile-de-France and the French state.

International expansion

Europe 

Málaga

In 2015, approximately 70 works from the Centre Pompidou's collection went on show in a temporary glass-and-steel structure called The Cube (El Cubo) in Málaga. According to the Spanish newspaper El País, the annual €1 million cost of the five-year project will be funded by the city council. The partnership with Málaga was announced by the city's mayor but was not confirmed by Pompidou Centre president Alain Seban until 24 April 2014. Approximately 100 works from the Pompidou's 20th and 21st century collection will be installed in the  space for two years, while a smaller area will be used for temporary exhibitions. Portraiture and the influence of Picasso will be among the subjects explored in the permanent display, organised by the Pompidou's deputy director Brigitte Leal. Highlights will include works by Alberto Giacometti, René Magritte, Alexander Calder and Constantin Brâncuși, and contemporary works by Sophie Calle, Bruce Nauman and Orlan. The city of Málaga also commissioned Daniel Buren to create a large-scale installation within El Cubo.

The city of Málaga will pay the Centre Pompidou €1 million a year for the brand and the use of the collection.

Brussels

In March 2018, the Centre Pompidou announced plans to open an offshoot branch in Brussels, under the name Kanal-Centre Pompidou. Housed in a former Citroën garage which was transformed by a team comprising ces noAarchitecten (Brussels), EM2N (Zurich) and Sergison Bates architects (London), the new centre brings together the  Museum of Modern and Contemporary Art, an architecture centre (CIVA Foundation) and public spaces devoted to culture, education and leisure. The Brussels-Capital region — which acquired the  Art Deco-style building in October 2015 — is the main funder project, with the conversion costing €122 million.

Asia 
In a joint proposal with the Solomon R. Guggenheim Museum presented in 2005, the Centre Pompidou planned to build a museum of modern and contemporary art, design and the media arts in Hong Kong's West Kowloon Cultural District.

In 2007, the then president Bruno Racine announced plans to open a museum carrying the Pompidou's name in Shanghai, with its programming to be determined by the Pompidou. The location chosen for the new museum was a former fire station in the Luwan district's Huaihai Park. However, the scheme did not materialize for several years, reportedly due to the lack of a legal framework for a non-profit foreign institution to operate in China. In 2019, the Centre Pompidou x West Bund Museum opened to the public, based in a wing of the  West Bund Art Museum designed by David Chipperfield. The inaugural exhibitions The Shape of Time, Highlights of the Centre Pompidou Collection and Observations, Highlights of the New Media Collection were curated by Marcella Lista.

Other projects include the Pompidou's joint venture with the King Abdulaziz Centre for World Culture, an arts complex incorporating a museum in Dhahran, the building of which has stalled.

North America 
In April 2014, Pompidou president Alain Seban confirmed that after Malaga (Spain), Mexico will be the next site for a pop-up Pompidou Centre. A satellite museum Centre Pompidou x Jersey City in Jersey City, New Jersey, will open in 2024, being the Pompidou's first satellite museum in North America.

South America 
There have been rumours of a pop-up Pompidou satellite museum in Brazil since Alain Seban announced the plan for these temporary locations back in 2012. At a talk on satellite museums at the Guggenheim on 24 April 2014, Alain Seban suggested that Brazil may be the third country to host a temporary satellite museum, after Spain and Mexico.

Management

Presidents 
 since 2021 : Laurent Le Bon
 2015 – 2021 : Serge Lasvignes
 2007 – 2015: Alain Seban
 2002 – 2007: Bruno Racine
 1996 – 2002: Jean-Jacques Aillagon
 1993 – 1996: François Barré
 1991 – 1993: Dominique Bozo
 1989 – 1991: Hélène Ahrweiler
 1983 – 1989: Jean Maheu
 1980 – 1983: Jean-Claude Groshens
 1977 – 1980: Jean Millier
 1976 – 1977: Robert Bordaz
 1969 – 1977: Georges Pompidou

Funding 

As a national museum, the Centre Pompidou is government-owned and subsidised by the Ministry of Culture (64.2% of its budget in 2012 : 82.8 on 129 million €), essentially for its staff. The Culture Ministry appoints its directors and controls its gestion, which is nevertheless independent, as Etablissement public à caractère administratif since its creation. In 2011, the museum earned $1.9 million from travelling exhibitions.

Established in 1977 as the institution's US philanthropic arm, the Georges Pompidou Art and Culture Foundation acquires and encourages major gifts of art and design for exhibition at the museum. Since 2006, the non-profit support group has brought in donations of 28 works, collectively valued at more than $14 million, and purchased many others. In 2013, New York-based art collectors Thea Westreich Wagner and Ethan Wagner announced their intention to donate about 300 works by 27 European and international artists to the Centre Pompidou, thereby making one of the largest gifts in the institution's history.

Use in film and television
Touche pas à la Femme Blanche
Catherine Deneuve (Actor), Marcello Mastroianni (Actor), Marco Ferreri (Director)
Gordon Matta-Clark Conical Intersect, 1975. Matta-Clark's contribution to the Paris Biennale 1975.
 Roberto Rossellini, Beaubourg, centre d'art et de culture, 1977. A documentary about the Centre which explores the building and its surroundings on its opening day. It was Rossellini's final film.
 Lewis Gilbert, Moonraker, 1979. A fifth-floor room of the building featured as the office of Holly Goodhead (played by Lois Chiles), in the 1979 James Bond film Moonraker, which in the film was scripted as being part of the space complex of the villainous Hugo Drax (Michael Lonsdale).
 Electric Light Orchestra, "Calling America" music video, 1986. ELO is shown performing the song in front of the centre.
 Claude Pinoteau, L'Étudiante, 1988.
 Richard Berry, L'Art (délicat) de la séduction, 2001.
 James Ivory, Le Divorce, 2003.
 Laurent Tirard, Mensonges et trahisons, 2004.
 Éric et Ramzy, Seuls Two, 2008.
JJ Burnel Euroman Cometh, 1979. The album cover shows JJ Burnel standing in front of the centre.

Public transport
 Nearby Métro stations: Rambuteau, Les Halles
 RER: Châtelet – Les Halles

See also 

 List of museums in Paris

References

External links

 Official website
 Bibliothèque publique d'information website
 Encyclopædia Britannica, Pompidou Centre
 Paris Pages – Musée National d'Art Moderne
 – Le Centre Pompidou et son rayonnement
 Photographs
 Preview of Pompidou-Metz extension at Specifier Magazine

1977 establishments in France
Art museums and galleries in Paris
Art museums established in 1977
Arts centres in France
Buildings and structures completed in 1977
Buildings and structures in the 4th arrondissement of Paris
Busking venues
Contemporary art galleries in France
Event venues established in 1977
High-tech architecture
Libraries established in 1977
Modern art museums in France
Modernist architecture in France
National museums of France
Ove Arup buildings and structures
Renzo Piano buildings
Richard Rogers buildings
ms:Centre Georges Pompidou